Hector Bianciotti (18 March 1930 – 12 June 2012) was an Argentine-born French author and member of the Académie française.

Biography
Born Héctor Bianciotti in Calchín Oeste in Córdoba Province, Argentina, Bianciotti's parents were immigrants from Piedmont, who communicated among themselves in the language of that region but who forbade its use with their son. Instead, they spoke Spanish to him. Bianciotti began his study of French in 1945. He arrived in France in 1961 and completed his French naturalization in 1981. In 1982, he stopped writing in any language but French, his favorite.

Bianciotti was elected to the Académie française on 18 January 1996 to Seat 2, succeeding André Frossard.

He died on 12 June 2012.

Honours and awards
Officer of the Légion d'honneur (Legion of Honour)
Officer of the Ordre national du Mérite (National Order of Merit)
Prix Femina (1985) for Sans la miséricorde du Christ

Bibliography
 1967: Les Déserts dorés: (Denoël)
 1969: Celle qui voyage la nuit:  (Denoël)
 1970: Les Autres, un soir d’été: (Gallimard)
 1972: Ce moment qui s’achève: (Denoël)
 1977: Le Traité des saisons: (Gallimard)
 1982: L’Amour n’est pas aimé: (Gallimard)
 1985: Sans la miséricorde du Christ: (Gallimard)
 1988: Seules les larmes seront comptées.: (Gallimard)
 1992: Ce que la nuit raconte au jour (What the Night Tells the Day) : (Grasset) 
 1995: Le Pas si lent de l’amour: (Grasset)
 1999: Comme la trace de l’oiseau dans l’air: (Grasset)
 2001: Une passion en toutes lettres: (Gallimard)
 2003: La nostalgie de la maison de Dieu: (Gallimard)

References

External links
 L'Académie française 

1930 births
2012 deaths
People from Córdoba Province, Argentina
Argentine emigrants to France
Argentine male writers
Argentine people of Italian descent
Argentine writers in French
Naturalized citizens of France
Argentine LGBT novelists
French LGBT novelists
Gay novelists
Members of the Académie Française
20th-century French novelists
20th-century French male writers
21st-century French novelists
Prix Femina winners
French people of Italian descent
Officiers of the Légion d'honneur
Officers of the Ordre national du Mérite
Prix Médicis étranger winners
French male novelists
21st-century French male writers